Bryan Edgar Magee (12 April 1930 – 26 July 2019) was a British philosopher, broadcaster, politician and author, best known for bringing philosophy to a popular audience.

A biography by journalist Mark Nayler is in preparation.

Early life
Born of working-class parents in Hoxton, London, in 1930, within a few hundred yards of where his paternal grandparents were born, Magee was brought up in a flat above the family clothing shop, where he shared a bed with his elder sister, Joan. He was close to his father but had a difficult relationship with his abusive and overbearing mother. He was evacuated to Market Harborough in Leicestershire, during World War II, but when he returned to London, much of Hoxton had been bombed flat. Magee was educated at Christ's Hospital school on a London County Council scholarship. During this formative period, he developed a keen interest in socialist politics, while during the school holidays he enjoyed listening to political orators at Speakers' Corner, Hyde Park, London, as well as regular visits to the theatre and concerts.

During his National Service he served in the British Army, in the Intelligence Corps, seeking possible spies among the refugees crossing the border between Yugoslavia and Austria. After demobilisation he won a scholarship to Keble College, Oxford, where he studied History as an undergraduate and then Philosophy, Politics and Economics in one year. His friends at Oxford included Robin Day, William Rees-Mogg, Jeremy Thorpe and Michael Heseltine. While at university, Magee was elected president of the Oxford Union. He later became an honorary fellow at Keble College.

At Oxford, Magee had mixed with poets as well as politicians and in 1951 published a volume of verse through the Fortune Press. The publisher did not pay its writers and expected them to buy a certain number of copies themselves – a similar deal had been struck with such writers as Dylan Thomas and Philip Larkin for their first anthologies. The slim volume was dedicated to the memory of Richard Wagner, with a quote from Rilke's Duino Elegies: ... das Schöne ist nichts als des Schrecklichen Anfang, den wir noch grade ertragen ("... beauty is nothing but the beginning of terror, that we are still able to bear"). Magee said later: "I'm rather ashamed of the poems now, although I have written poems since which I haven't published, which I secretly think are rather good. It has always been a dimension of what I do." (Later he would also publish fiction, including a spy novel To Live in Danger in 1960 and then a long work Facing Death. The latter, initially composed in the 1960s but not published until 1977, would be shortlisted for an award by The Yorkshire Post).

In 1955 he began a year studying philosophy at Yale University on a postgraduate fellowship. He had expected to hate America but found that he loved it. His deep admiration of the country's equality of opportunity was expressed in a swift series of books, Go West, Young Man (1958), The New Radicalism (1963) and The Democratic Revolution (1964).

Politician 

Magee returned to Britain with hopes of becoming a Labour Member of Parliament (MP). He twice stood unsuccessfully for Mid Bedfordshire, at the 1959 general election and the 1960 by-election, and instead took a job presenting the ITV current affairs television programme This Week. He made documentary programmes about subjects of social concern such as prostitution, sexually transmitted diseases, abortion and homosexuality (illegal in Britain at the time). Interviewed in 2003, Magee said: British society was illiberal in a number of areas that are now taken for granted... Roy Jenkins changed them and he was bitterly opposed by the Tories. But if you were liberal with a small L there was a menu of social change and I believed very strongly in that whole liberal agenda.

He was eventually elected MP for Leyton at the February 1974 general election, but from 1981 found himself out of tune with the Labour Party's direction under Michael Foot. On 22 January 1982 he resigned the Labour whip and in March joined the defection of centrist Labour MPs to the newly founded Social Democratic Party. He lost his seat at the 1983 general election.

Magee returned to writing and broadcasting which, indeed, he had continued during his parliamentary career and would also serve on various boards and committees. He notably resigned as chairman of the Arts Council music panel in 1994 in protest at funding cuts.

He also returned to scholarship at Oxford, first as a fellow at Wolfson, then at New College. He also found more time to write classical music reviews and worked on his own compositions. He admitted that, while his own work was "whistleable", it was also "inherently sentimental".

Interviewed in 2003, Oxford contemporary William Rees-Mogg recalled "we never knew which way Bryan would jump. And as his life later demonstrated, there was always a question of whether he was basically at heart an intellectual or someone interested in public life. So it wasn't a surprise that he went into public life, but the intellectual was really the predominant element in his personality and the books seemed to represent the real Bryan more than the political activity did."

Broadcaster and writer

Interviews with philosophers 
Magee's most important influence in popular culture were his efforts to make philosophy accessible to the layman.

In 1970–71 he presented a series for BBC Radio 3 entitled Conversations with Philosophers. The series took the form of Magee in conversation with a number of contemporary British philosophers, discussing both their own work, and the work of earlier 20th-century British philosophers. The series began with an introductory conversation between Magee and Anthony Quinton. Other programmes included discussions on Bertrand Russell, G. E. Moore and J. L. Austin, Ludwig Wittgenstein, and the relationship between philosophy and religion, among others. Extracts of each of the conversations were printed in The Listener shortly after broadcast. And extensively revised versions of all the discussions would be made available in the 1971 book Modern British Philosophy. Karl Popper would appear in the series twice and Magee would soon after write an introductory book on his philosophy that was first published in 1973.

In 1978 Magee presented 15 dialogues with noted philosophers for BBC Television in a series called Men of Ideas. This was a series that, as noted in The Daily Telegraph, "achieved the near-impossible feat of presenting to a mass audience recondite issues of philosophy without compromising intellectual integrity or losing ratings" and "attracted a steady one million viewers per show." Following an "Introduction to Philosophy", presented by Magee in discussion with Isaiah Berlin, Magee discussed topics like Marxist philosophy, the Frankfurt School, the ideas of Noam Chomsky and modern Existentialism in subsequent episodes. During the broadcast run, edited shorter versions of the discussions were published weekly in The Listener magazine. Extensively revised versions of the dialogues within the Men of Ideas series (which featured Iris Murdoch) were originally published in a book of the same name that is now sold under the title of Talking Philosophy. DVDs of the series are sold to academic institutions with the title Contemporary Philosophy. Neither this series nor its 1987 'sequel' are available for purchase by home users but most of the episodes are freely available on Youtube.

Another BBC television series, The Great Philosophers, followed in 1987. In this series, Magee discussed the major historical figures of Western philosophy with fifteen contemporary philosophers. The series covered the philosophies of Plato, Aristotle, and Descartes, among others, including a discussion with Peter Singer on the philosophy of Marx and Hegel, and ending with a discussion with John Searle on the philosophy of Wittgenstein. Extensively revised versions of the dialogues were published in a book of the same name that was published that same year. Magee's 1998 book The Story of Thought (also published as The Story of Philosophy) would also cover the history of Western philosophy.

Between the two series, Magee released the first edition of the work he regarded as closest to his "academic magnum opus": The Philosophy of Schopenhauer (first published in 1983, substantially revised and extended, 1997). This remains one of the most substantial and wide-ranging treatments of the thinker and assesses in-depth Schopenhauer's influence on Wittgenstein, Wagner and other creative writers. Magee also addresses Schopenhauer's thoughts on homosexuality and the influence of Buddhism on his thought.

Later work and interest in Wagner 
In 1997 Magee's Confessions of a Philosopher was published. This essentially offered an introduction to philosophy in autobiographical form. The book was involved in a libel lawsuit as a result of Magee repeating the rumour that Ralph Schoenman, a controversial associate of Bertrand Russell during the philosopher's final decade, had been planted by the CIA in an effort to discredit Russell. Schoenman successfully sued Magee for libel in the UK, with the result that the first printing of the British edition of the book was pulped. A second defamation suit, filed in California against Random House, was settled in 2001. The allegations were expunged by settlement, and a new edition was issued and provided to more than 700 academic and public libraries. In Confessions of a Philosopher, Magee charts his own philosophical development in an autobiographical context. He also emphasizes the importance of Schopenhauer's philosophy as a serious attempt to solve philosophical problems. In addition to this, he launches a critique of analytic philosophy, particularly in its linguistic form over three chapters, contesting its fundamental principles and lamenting its influence.

Magee had a particular interest in the life, thought and music of Richard Wagner and wrote two notable books on the composer and his world, Aspects of Wagner (1968; rev. 1988), and Wagner and Philosophy (2000). In Aspects of Wagner Magee "outlines the range and depth of Wagner's achievement, and shows how his sensational and erotic music expresses the repressed and highly charged contents of the psyche. He also examines Wagner's detailed stage directions, and the prose works in which he formulated his ideas, and sheds interesting new light on his anti-semitism." The revised edition includes a fresh chapter on "Wagner as Music".

In 2016, approaching his 86th birthday, Magee had his book Ultimate Questions published by Princeton University. Writing in The Independent, Julian Baggini said "Magee doesn't always match his clarity of expression with rigour of argument, sometimes ignoring his own principle that the feeling 'Yes, surely this must be right' is 'not a validation, not even a credential'. But this can be excused. Plato and Aristotle claimed that philosophy begins with wonder. Magee is proof that for some, the wonder never dies, it only deepens."

In 2018 Magee, who was then living in one room in a nursing hospital in Oxford, was interviewed by Jason Cowley of New Statesman and discussed his life and his 2016 book Ultimate Questions. Magee said that he believed he lacked originality and, until Ultimate Questions, had struggled to make an original contribution to philosophy, saying:
Popper had this originality, Russell had it, and Einstein had it in spades. Einstein created a way of seeing things which transformed the way we see the world and the way we even understand such fundamental things as time and space. And I fundamentally understand that I could never do that, never. I wish I was in that class – not because I want to be a clever chap but because I want to do things that are at a much better level than I've done them.
He explained that he followed the news and politics closely and that he considered the vote for Brexit to have been a "historic mistake".

Personal life 
In 1953, Magee was appointed to a teaching job in Sweden and while there met Ingrid Söderlund, a pharmacist in the university laboratory. They married and had one daughter, Gunnela and, in time, three grandchildren. Magee later said: The marriage broke up pretty quickly and it was a fairly disastrous period of my life. I came back to Oxford as a postgraduate. But since then Sweden has been a part of my life. I go there every year and my daughter visits me. I always assumed that sooner or later I'd get married again but it never quite happened, although I had some very long relationships. And now I don't want to get married again. I like the freedom.

His memoir, Clouds of Glory: A Hoxton Childhood, won the J. R. Ackerley Prize for Autobiography in 2004.

Death 
Magee died on 26 July 2019, at the age of 89, at St Luke's Hospital in Headington, Oxford. He is survived by his Swedish daughter Gunnela and her children and grandchildren. His funeral took place on 15 August.

The last of Magee's books to be published during his lifetime – Making the Most of It (2018) – closes:

A celebration of his life was held in the chapel of Keble College, Oxford, on 29 October 2019. The event was opened by Sir Jonathan Phillips, Warden of Keble College, and was introduced by Magee's executor, the academic, author and editor Henry Hardy. It included audio and video clips of Magee, music chosen by him and played by the Amherst Sextet, and addresses by David Owen and Simon Callow. The music choices were the sextet from Strauss's Capriccio, the largo from Elgar's Serenade for Strings and the prelude to Wagner's Tristan und Isolde. The addresses by Owen and Callow were published together with a notice of Magee's life by Hardy in the Oldie.

Filmography

Television
 Men of Ideas (BBC, 1978), host
 Thinking Aloud (1984–1985), host
 The Great Philosophers (BBC, 1987), host

Bibliography

Books
(Some available for loan on Open Library)

Crucifixion and Other Poems, 1951, Fortune Press, ASIN: B0039UQCKK
Go West, Young Man, Eyre And Spottiswoode, 1958, 
To Live in Danger, Hutchinson, 1960 (softcover Random House )
The New Radicalism, Secker & Warburg, 1962, ASIN B0006D7RZW
The Democratic Revolution, Bodley Head, 1964, 
Towards 2000: The world we make, Macdonald & Co, 1965, ASIN B0000CMK0Y
One in Twenty: A Study of Homosexuality in Men and Women, Stein and Day, 1966.  (later published as The Gays Among Us)
The Television Interviewer, Macdonald, 1966, ASIN B0000CN1D4
Aspects of Wagner, Secker and Warburg, 1968; rev. 2nd ed, 1988, Oxford University Press, 1988, 
Modern British Philosophy, Secker and Warburg, 1971, ; Oxford University Press,  [Available for loan on Internet Archive]
Karl Popper, Penguin, 1973,  (Viking Press, ; also titled Popper, and later titled Philosophy and the Real World, 1985)
Facing Death, William Kimber & Co. Ltd., 1977, 
Men of Ideas: Some Creators of Contemporary Philosophy, Oxford University Press, 1978  (later titled Talking Philosophy: Dialogues With Fifteen Leading Philosophers)
The Philosophy of Schopenhauer, Oxford University Press, 1983 (revised and expanded, 1997), 
The Great Philosophers: An Introduction to Western Philosophy, BBC Books 1987, Oxford University Press, 2000, 
On Blindness: Letters between Bryan Magee and Martin Milligan, Oxford University Press, 1996,  (also published as Sight Unseen, Phoenix House, 1998)
Confessions of a Philosopher, Random House, 1997, reprinted 1998, 
The Story of Thought: The Essential Guide to the History of Western Philosophy, The Quality Paperback Bookclub, 1998,  (later titled The Story of Philosophy, 2001)
Wagner and Philosophy, Penguin, 2001,  (also published as The Tristan Chord: Wagner and Philosophy, Owl Books, 2001 )
Clouds of Glory, Pimlico, 2004, 
Growing up in a War, Pimlico, 2007, 
Ultimate Questions, Princeton University Press, 2016, 
Making the Most of It, Studio 28, 2018,

Journal articles
At JSTOR – free to read online with registration:

 Richard Wagner Died 13 February 1883. Producing a New 'Ring' The Musical Times, vol. 124, no. 1680, 1983, pp. 86–89. [Interview with Peter Hall]
 Schopenhauer and Professor Hamlyn Philosophy, vol. 60, no. 233, 1985, pp. 389–391. 
 A Note on J. L. Austin and the Drama. Philosophy, vol. 74, no. 287, 1999, pp. 119–121.
 What I Believe Philosophy, vol. 77, no. 301, 2002, pp. 407–419..
 Philosophy's Neglect of the Arts Philosophy, vol. 80, no. 313, 2005, pp. 413–422. 
 The Secret of Tristan and Isolde Philosophy, vol. 82, no. 320, 2007, pp. 339–346. 
 Intimations of Mortality Philosophy, vol. 86, no. 335, 2011, pp. 31–39.

References

External links

Obituaries 

Bryan Magee – Obituary by Henry Hardy for Wolfson College (26 July 2019)
Bryan Magee, author, broadcaster, MP and academic with an unsurpassed ability to render complex philosophical ideas easily digestible. The Telegraph (26 July 2019).
Bryan Magee, Who Brought Philosophy to British TV, Dies at 89 Obituary by Palko Karasz for The New York Times (28 July 2019)
Bryan Magee: 1930–2019—the champion of philosophical wonderment Obituary by Julian Baggini for Prospect (29 July 2019)
Obituary: Bryan Magee, MP, presented philosophy programme on Television and Wagner authority The Herald (10 August 2019)
OBITUARY: Bryan Magee, ex-Oxford Union president and BBC presenter by James Roberts for The Oxford Times (15 August 2019)
Bryan Magee, philosopher, writer and broadcaster, 1930–2019 by Jonathan Derbyshire for the Financial Times (17 August 2019)

Further resources 

Sense and nonsense Prospect magazine article by Bryan Magee (2009)

Extracts of Homosexuals (1964) and Lesbians (1965) posted on Youtube by the British Film Institute
Photograph of Magee by Sijmen Hendriks, Amsterdam, 2011
MP3 files of Magee's interviews with philosophers
"Philosophy: Bryan Magee" from Free Thinking, BBC Radio 3, 2016
"Bryan Magee: a tribute". by David Herman for TheArticle. (26 July 2019)

1930 births
2019 deaths
Alumni of Keble College, Oxford
Analytic philosophers
British ethicists
British logicians
20th-century British philosophers
Epistemologists
Fellows of Balliol College, Oxford
Historians of philosophy
Labour Party (UK) MPs for English constituencies
Metaphysicians
Opera critics
Ontologists
People educated at Christ's Hospital
People from Hoxton
Philosophers of culture
Philosophers of education
Philosophers of history
Philosophers of logic
Philosophers of mind
Philosophy writers
Political philosophers
Presidents of the Oxford Union
Social Democratic Party (UK) MPs for English constituencies
British social commentators
Social philosophers
UK MPs 1974
UK MPs 1974–1979
UK MPs 1979–1983
Presidents of the Critics' Circle
Wagner scholars